Jun Woong-tae (born 1 August 1995) is a South Korean modern pentathlete.

Sports career
The athlete from Seoul was the first Korean player to win a ticket to the 2020 Tokyo Olympics after a series of victories, including  winning the UIPM World Cup in 2018, winning a gold medal at the Asian Games in Jakarta and Palembang in the same year, and a bronze medal in the individual event at the World Championships in 2019. Woongtae also competed at the 2016 Summer Olympics in Rio de Janeiro, in the men's event, achieving 19th place.

Woongtae started out as a swimmer, before being encouraged by one of his teachers at the Seoul Sports Middle School to pursue modern pentathlon. He trained and mastered the five disciplines of the sport with the support of his school, the Gwangju City Hall and the Korean Modern Pentathlon Federation, as well as the unequivocal support from his parents.

As of July 21, 2021, Woongtae Jun is 4th in the UIPM Senior Global World Championships Ranking and 1st in the UIPM Senior World Cup Ranking, making him one of the sports' most promising medal prospects for the 2020 Tokyo Olympic Games 

When reflecting on his performance during the 2016 Rio Olympics, Woongtae candidly spoke of his inexperience at the time and spoke of his commitment to train harder and prepare more, with hopes of being selected to represent South Korea and win a medal at the Tokyo 2020 Summer Olympics.

“I will definitely win a medal at the Tokyo Olympics next year and make the modern pentathlon into the most important event in Korea.” 

At the 2020 Summer Olympics held in August 2021, Jun won the bronze medal in men's individual modern pentathlon, behind winner Joe Choong and silver medalist Ahmed El-Gendy. His bronze medal was the first Olympic medal from a competitor from South Korea in this sport.

References

External links

1995 births
Living people
South Korean male modern pentathletes
Olympic modern pentathletes of South Korea
Modern pentathletes at the 2016 Summer Olympics
Asian Games medalists in modern pentathlon
Modern pentathletes at the 2018 Asian Games
Asian Games gold medalists for South Korea
Medalists at the 2018 Asian Games
World Modern Pentathlon Championships medalists
Modern pentathletes at the 2020 Summer Olympics
Sportspeople from Seoul
Medalists at the 2020 Summer Olympics
Olympic medalists in modern pentathlon
Olympic bronze medalists for South Korea
20th-century South Korean people
21st-century South Korean people